Stade de la SONABEL is a multi-use stadium in Ouagadougou, Burkina Faso.  It is currently used mostly for football matches and is the home stadium of Association Sportive SONABEL.  The stadium holds 5,000 people.

SONABEL
Buildings and structures in Ouagadougou